Bruce Harper (born June 20, 1955) is a retired American football running back and kick returner for the New York Jets of the NFL. He was signed as an undrafted free agent out of Kutztown by the Jets in 1977. Bruce Harper is the all-time kick returner in New York Jets history with 5,407 yards in kickoff returns. He also served as the Jets punt returner from 1977 to 1982, totalling 1,784 PR yards and 1 touchdown. Harper also played running back. His total yards are 11,429: 1,829 rushing yards, 2,409 receiving yards, 1,784 PR yards and 5,407 KR yards.

Harper played high school football at Dwight Morrow High School in Englewood. He moved on to play at Kutztown State College, where he became the school's first 1,000 yard rusher.

Harper's 42 jersey is the jersey worn by diehard Jets fan  Fireman Ed.

Harper was a longtime resident of Norwood, New Jersey, but now lives in Closter, New Jersey.

Harper is founder and director of the non-for-profit organization Heroes & Cool Kids, established in 1998. Based in school systems throughout New Jersey, the mentoring program reaches out to elementary and middle-school kids by high school athletes and students of the same district. The high school students are trained through the Heroes and Cool Kids' curriculum and by former professional athletes, such as former NFL player, Keith Elias, former Los Angeles Lakers player, John Celestand, and former New Jersey Nets player, Tim Bassett.

References

External links
Rival Coaches Laud Harper
 Jet's Harper Proves He's Not Too Small
Heroes and Cool Kids

1955 births
Living people
African-American players of American football
American football running backs
American football return specialists
Dwight Morrow High School alumni
Kutztown Golden Bears football players
New York Jets players
People from Closter, New Jersey
People from Englewood, New Jersey
People from Norwood, New Jersey
Players of American football from New Jersey
Sportspeople from Bergen County, New Jersey
21st-century African-American people
20th-century African-American sportspeople